This item lists those birds of South Asia in the passerine families from  pittas to cisticolas.

For an introduction to the birds of the region and a key to the status abbreviations, see List of birds of the South Asia.

For the rest of the species lists, see:
 part 1 Megapodes, Galliformes, Gruiformes and near passerines.
 part 2 Remainder of non-passerines
 part 4 Passerines from Old World warblers to buntings.

Passeriformes
 Family: Pittidae
 Eared pitta V Pitta phayrei
 Blue-naped pitta r Pitta nipalensis
 Blue pitta r Pitta cyanea
 Hooded pitta r Pitta sordida
 Indian pitta R Pitta brachyura
 Mangrove pitta N r Pitta megarhyncha
 Family: Eurylaimidae
 Silver-breasted broadbill r Serilophus lunatus
 Long-tailed broadbill r Psarisomus dalhousiae
 Family: Irenidae
 Asian fairy bluebird r Irena puella
 Blue-winged leafbird R Chloropsis cochinchinensis 
 Golden-fronted leafbird R Chloropsis aurifrons
 Orange-bellied leafbird r Chloropsis hardwickii
 Family: Laniidae
 Red-backed shrike p Lanius collurio
 Isabelline shrike W Lanius isabellinus
 Brown shrike W Lanius cristatus
 Burmese shrike p Lanius collurioides
 Bay-backed shrike R Lanius vittatus
 Long-tailed shrike R Lanius schach
 Grey-backed shrike rW Lanius tephronotus
 Lesser grey shrike V Lanius minor
 Great grey shrike V Lanius excubitor
 Southern grey shrike R Lanius meridionalis
 Family: Corvidae
 Mangrove whistler r Pachycephala grisola
 Eurasian jay R Garrulus glandarius
 Black-headed jay R Garrulus lanceolatus
 Sri Lanka blue magpie V r Urocissa ornata
 Yellow-billed blue magpie R Urocissa flavirostris
 Red-billed blue magpie R Urocissa erythrorhyncha
 Green magpie r Cissa chinensis
 Rufous treepie R Dendrocitta vagabunda
 Grey treepie R Dendrocitta formosae
 White-bellied treepie r Dendrocitta leucogastra
 Collared treepie r Dendrocitta frontalis
 Andaman treepie N R Dendrocitta bayleyi
 Black-billed magpie r Pica pica
 Spotted nutcracker r Nucifraga caryocatactes
 Red-billed chough R Pyrrhocorax pyrrhocorax
 Alpine chough R Pyrrhocorax graculus
 Eurasian jackdaw rw Corvus monedula
 House crow R Corvus splendens
 Rook W Corvus frugilegus
 Carrion crow rw Corvus corone
 Large-billed crow R Corvus macrorhynchos
 Brown-necked raven Corvus ruficollis
 Common raven r Corvus corax
 Family: Artamidae
 Ashy woodswallow R Artamus fuscus
 White-breasted woodswallow r Artamus leucorynchus
 Family: Oriolidae
 Eurasian golden oriole R Oriolus oriolus
 Black-naped oriole rw Oriolus chinensis
 Slender-billed oriole r Oriolus tenuirostris
 Black-hooded oriole R Oriolus xanthornus
 Maroon oriole r Oriolus traillii
 Large cuckooshrike r Coracina macei
 Bar-bellied cuckooshrike r Coracina striata
 Black-winged cuckooshrike r Coracina melaschistos
 Black-headed cuckooshrike r Coracina melanoptera
 Pied triller r Lalage nigra
 Rosy minivet rw Pericrocotus roseus
 Swinhoe's minivet V Pericrocotus cantonensis
 Ashy minivet W Pericrocotus divaricatus
 Small minivet R Pericrocotus cinnamomeus
 White-bellied minivet r Pericrocotus erythropygius
 Grey-chinned minivet r Pericrocotus solaris
 Long-tailed minivet R Pericrocotus ethologus
 Short-billed minivet r Pericrocotus brevirostris
 Scarlet minivet R Pericrocotus flammeus
 Bar-winged flycatcher-shrike R Hemipus picatus 
 Family: Dicruridae
 Yellow-bellied fantail R Rhipidura hypoxantha
 White-throated fantail R Rhipidura albicollis
 White-browed fantail flycatcher R Rhipidura aureola
 Black drongo R Dicrurus macrocercus
 Ashy drongo R Dicrurus leucophaeus
 White-bellied drongo r Dicrurus caerulescens
 Crow-billed drongo r Dicrurus annectans
 Bronzed drongo r Dicrurus aeneus
 Lesser racket-tailed drongo r Dicrurus remifer
 Hair-crested drongo R Dicrurus hottentottus
 Andaman drongo N R Dicrurus andamanensis
 Greater racket-tailed drongo r Dicrurus paradiseus
 Family: Monarchidae
 Black-naped monarch r Hypothymis azurea
 Asian paradise-flycatcher R Terpsiphone paradisi
 Family: Aegithinidae
 Common iora R Aegithina tiphia
 Marshall's iora r Aegithina nigrolutea
 Family: Prionopidae
 Large woodshrike r Tephrodornis gularis
 Common woodshrike R Tephrodornis pondicerianus
 Family: Bombycillidae
 Bohemian waxwing V Bombycilla garrulus
 Family: Cinclidae
 White-throated dipper R Cinclus cinclus
 Brown dipper R Cinclus pallasii
 Family: Turdidae
 Rufous-tailed rock thrush sp Monticola saxatilis
 Blue-capped rock thrush R Monticola cinclorhynchus
 Chestnut-bellied rock thrush r Monticola rufiventris
 Blue rock thrush rW Monticola solitarius
 Sri Lanka whistling thrush E R Myophonus blighi
 Malabar whistling thrush R Myophonus horsfieldii
 Blue whistling thrush R Myophonus caeruleus
 Pied thrush sp Zoothera wardii
 Orange-headed thrush R Zoothera citrina
 Siberian thrush W Zoothera sibirica
 Spot-winged thrush N r Zoothera spiloptera
 Plain-backed thrush r Zoothera mollissima
 Long-tailed thrush r Zoothera dixoni
 Scaly thrush r Zoothera dauma
 Long-billed thrush r Zoothera monticola
 Dark-sided thrush r Zoothera marginata
 Tickell's thrush R Turdus unicolor
 Black-breasted thrush W Turdus dissimilis
 White-collared blackbird r Turdus albocinctus
 Grey-winged blackbird r Turdus boulboul
 Eurasian blackbird r Turdus merula
 Chestnut thrush r Turdus rubrocanus
 Kessler's thrush V Turdus kessleri
 Grey-sided thrush W Turdus feae
 Eyebrowed thrush W Turdus obscurus
 Dark-throated thrush W Turdus ruficollis
 Dusky thrush W Turdus naumanni
 Fieldfare V Turdus pilaris
 Song thrush V Turdus philomelos
 Mistle thrush r Turdus viscivorus
 Ashy-headed laughingthrush V r Garrulax cinereifrons
 White-throated laughingthrush R Garrulax albogularis
 White-crested laughingthrush R Garrulax leucolophus
 Lesser necklaced laughingthrush r Garrulax monileger
 Greater necklaced laughingthrush r Garrulax pectoralis
 Striated laughingthrush r Garrulax striatus
 Rufous-necked laughingthrush r Garrulax ruficollis
 Chestnut-backed laughingthrush N r Garrulax nuchalis
 Yellow-throated laughingthrush r Garrulax galbanus
 Wynaad laughingthrush r Garrulax delesserti
 Rufous-vented laughingthrush r Garrulax gularis
 Moustached laughingthrush r Garrulax cineraceus
 Rufous-chinned laughingthrush r Garrulax rufogularis
 Spotted laughingthrush r Garrulax ocellatus
 Grey-sided laughingthrush r Garrulax caerulatus 
 Spot-breasted laughingthrush r Garrulax merulinus
 White-browed laughingthrush r Garrulax sannio
 Nilgiri laughingthrush E r Garrulax cachinnans
 Grey-breasted laughingthrush N r Garrulax jerdoni
 Streaked laughingthrush R Garrulax lineatus
 Striped laughingthrush r Garrulax virgatus
 Brown-capped laughingthrush r Garrulax austeni
 Blue-winged laughingthrush r Garrulax squamatus
 Scaly laughingthrush r Garrulax subunicolor
 Elliot's laughingthrush r Garrulax elliotii
 Variegated laughingthrush r Garrulax variegatus
 Brown-cheeked laughingthrush r Garrulax henrici
 Black-faced laughingthrush r Garrulax affinis
 Chestnut-crowned laughingthrush r Garrulax erythrocephalus
 Red-faced liocichla r Liocichla phoenicea
 Bugun liocichla Liocichla bugunorum
 Gould's shortwing r Brachypteryx stellata
 Rusty-bellied shortwing V r Brachypteryx hyperythra
 White-bellied shortwing V r Brachypteryx major
 Lesser shortwing r Brachypteryx leucophrys
 White-browed shortwing r Brachypteryx montana
 Family: Muscicapidae
 Brown-chested jungle flycatcher wr? Rhinomyias brunneata
 Spotted flycatcher p Muscicapa striata
 Dark-sided flycatcher r Muscicapa sibirica
 Asian brown flycatcher rw Muscicapa dauurica
 Rusty-tailed flycatcher r Muscicapa ruficauda
 Brown-breasted flycatcher r Muscicapa muttui
 Ferruginous flycatcher r Muscicapa ferruginea
 Yellow-rumped flycatcher V Ficedula zanthopygia
 Slaty-backed flycatcher r Ficedula hodgsonii
 Rufous-gorgeted flycatcher r Ficedula strophiata
 Red-throated flycatcher W Ficedula albicilla
 Kashmir flycatcher V r Ficedula subrubra
 White-gorgeted flycatcher r Ficedula monileger
 Snowy-browed flycatcher r Ficedula hyperythra
 Little pied flycatcher r Ficedula westermanni
 Ultramarine flycatcher r Ficedula superciliaris
 Slaty-blue flycatcher r Ficedula tricolor
 Sapphire flycatcher r Ficedula sapphira
 Black-and-orange flycatcher N r Ficedula nigrorufa
 Verditer flycatcher R Eumyias thalassina
 Dull-blue flycatcher N r Eumyias sordida
 Nilgiri flycatcher N r Eumyias albicaudata
 Large niltava r Niltava grandis
 Small niltava r Niltava macgrigoriae
 Rufous-bellied niltava r Niltava sundara
 Vivid niltava r Niltava vivida
 White-tailed flycatcher r Cyornis concretus
 White-bellied blue flycatcher r Cyornis pallipes
 Pale-chinned blue-flycatcher r Cyornis poliogenys
 Pale blue flycatcher r Cyornis unicolor
 Blue-throated flycatcher r Cyornis rubeculoides
 Tickell's blue flycatcher R Cyornis tickelliae
 Pygmy blue flycatcher r Muscicapella hodgsoni
 Grey-headed canary flycatcher R Culicicapa ceylonensis
 Nightingale V Luscinia megarhynchos
 Siberian rubythroat W Luscinia calliope
 White-tailed rubythroat rW Luscinia pectoralis
 Bluethroat sW Luscinia svecica
 Firethroat N V Luscinia pectardens
 Indian blue robin r Luscinia brunnea
 Siberian blue robin V Luscinia cyane
 Red-flanked bluetail r Tarsiger cyanurus
 Golden bush robin r Tarsiger chrysaeus
 White-browed bush robin r Tarsiger indicus
 Rufous-breasted bush robin r Tarsiger hyperythrus
 Rufous-tailed scrub robin p Cercotrichas galactotes
 Oriental magpie robin R Copsychus saularis
 White-rumped shama R Copsychus malabaricus
 Indian robin R Saxicoloides fulicata
 Rufous-backed redstart W Phoenicurus erythronota
 Blue-capped redstart r Phoenicurus coeruleocephalus
 Black redstart rW Phoenicurus ochruros
 Common redstart P Phoenicurus phoenicurus
 Hodgson's redstart W Phoenicurus hodgsoni
 White-throated redstart r Phoenicurus schisticeps
 Daurian redstart rw Phoenicurus auroreus
 White-winged redstart r Phoenicurus erythrogaster
 Blue-fronted redstart r Phoenicurus frontalis
 White-capped water redstart r Chaimarrornis leucocephalus
 Plumbeous water redstart r Rhyacornis fuliginosus
 White-bellied redstart r Hodgsonius phaenicuroides
 White-tailed robin r Myiomela leucura
 Blue-fronted robin r Cinclidium frontale
 Grandala r Grandala coelicolor
 Little forktail r Enicurus scouleri
 Black-backed forktail r Enicurus immaculatus
 Slaty-backed forktail r Enicurus schistaceus
 White-crowned forktail r Enicurus leschenaulti
 Spotted forktail r Enicurus maculatus
 Purple cochoa r Cochoa purpurea
 Green cochoa r Cochoa viridis
 Stoliczka's bushchat V r Saxicola macrorhyncha
 Hodgson's bushchat V w  Saxicola insignis
 Siberian stonechat R Saxicola maura
 White-tailed stonechat r Saxicola leucura
 Pied bushchat R Saxicola caprata
 Jerdon's bushchat r Saxicola jerdoni
 Grey bushchat R Saxicola ferrea
 Hooded wheatear Oenanthe monacha
 Hume's wheatear r Oenanthe alboniger
 Northern wheatear P Oenanthe oenanthe
 Finsch's wheatear rw Oenanthe finschii 
 Variable wheatear rw Oenanthe picata 
 Pied wheatear rw Oenanthe pleschanka
 Rufous-tailed wheatear rw Oenanthe xanthoprymna
 Desert wheatear rw Oenanthe deserti
 Isabelline wheatear rw Oenanthe isabellina
 Brown rock-chat R Cercomela fusca
 Family: Sturnidae
 Asian glossy starling r Aplonis panayensis
 Spot-winged starling r Saroglossa spiloptera
 White-faced starling V r Sturnus senex
 Chestnut-tailed starling R Sturnus malabaricus
 White-headed starling r Sturnus erythropygius
 Brahminy starling R Sturnus pagodarum
 Purple-backed starling V Sturnus sturninus
 White-shouldered starling V Sturnus sinensis
 Rose-coloured starling WP Sturnus roseus
 Common starling wp Sturnus vulgaris
 Asian pied starling R Sturnus contra
 Common myna R Acridotheres tristis
 Bank myna R Acridotheres ginginianus
 Jungle myna R Acridotheres fuscus
 White-vented myna r Acridotheres cinereus
 Collared myna r Acridotheres albocinctus
 Golden-crested myna r Ampeliceps coronatus
 Sri Lanka myna r N Gracula ptilogenys
 Hill myna r Gracula religiosa
 Family: Sittidae
 Chestnut-vented nuthatch r Sitta nagaensis
 Kashmir nuthatch r Sitta cashmirensis
 Chestnut-bellied nuthatch R Sitta castanea
 White-tailed nuthatch r Sitta himalayensis
 White-cheeked nuthatch r Sitta leucopsis
 Eastern rock nuthatch Sitta tephronota
 Velvet-fronted nuthatch R Sitta frontalis
 Beautiful nuthatch V r Sitta formosa
 Family: Tichodromidae
 Wallcreeper rw Tichodroma muraria
 Family: Certhiidae
 Eurasian treecreeper R Certhia familiaris
 Bar-tailed treecreeper R Certhia himalayana
 Rusty-flanked treecreeper r Certhia nipalensis
 Brown-throated treecreeper r Certhia discolor
 Spotted creeper r Salpornis spilonotus
 Family: Troglodytidae
 Winter wren r Troglodytes troglodytes
 Family: Paridae
 White-crowned penduline tit r Remiz coronatus
 Fire-capped tit r Cephalopyrus flammiceps
 Rufous-naped tit r Parus rufonuchalis
 Rufous-vented tit r Parus rubidiventris
 Spot-winged tit r Parus melanolophus
 Coal tit r Parus ater
 Grey-crested tit r Parus dichrous
 Brown crested tit
 Great tit R Parus major
 Green-backed tit R Parus monticolus
 White-naped tit r Parus nuchalis
 Black-lored tit r Parus xanthogenys
 Yellow-cheeked tit r Parus spilonotus
 Azure tit Parus cyanus
 Yellow-breasted tit Parus flavipectus
 Yellow-browed tit r Sylviparus modestus
 Sultan tit r Melanochlora sultanea
 Hume's ground tit r Pseudopodoces humilis 
 Family: Aegithalidae
 White-cheeked tit r Aegithalos leucogenys
 Black-throated tit R Aegithalos concinnus
 White-throated tit r Aegithalos niveogularis
 Rufous-fronted tit r Aegithalos iouschistos
 Family: Hirundinidae
 Pale martin pr? Riparia diluta
 Sand martin r Riparia riparia
 Plain martin R Riparia paludicola
 Crag martin r Hirundo rupestris
 Rock martin V Hirundo fuligula
 Dusky crag martin R Hirundo concolor
 Barn swallow RW Hirundo rustica
 Pacific swallow r Hirundo tahitica
 Wire-tailed swallow R Hirundo smithii
 Red-rumped swallow RW Hirundo daurica
 Striated swallow r Hirundo striolata
 Streak-throated swallow R Hirundo fluvicola
 Common house martin rw Delichon urbica
 Asian house martin r Delichon dasypus
 Nepal house martin r Delichon nipalensis
 Family: Regulidae
 Goldcrest r Regulus regulus
 Family: Pycnonotidae
 Crested finchbill r Spizixos canifrons
 Striated bulbul r Pycnonotus striatus
 Grey-headed bulbul r Pycnonotus priocephalus
 Black-headed bulbul r Pycnonotus atriceps
 Black-crested bulbul R Pycnonotus melanicterus 
 Red-whiskered bulbul R Pycnonotus jocosus
 White-eared bulbul R Pycnonotus leucotis
 Himalayan bulbul R Pycnonotus leucogenys
 Red-vented bulbul R Pycnonotus cafer
 Yellow-throated bulbul V r Pycnonotus xantholaemus
 Yellow-eared bulbul V r Pynconotus penicillatus
 Flavescent bulbul r Pycnonotus flavescens
 White-browed bulbul r Pycnonotus luteolus
 White-throated bulbul r Alophoixus flaveolus
 Olive bulbul r Iole virescens
 Yellow-browed bulbul r Iole indica
 Ashy bulbul r Hemixos flavala
 Mountain bulbul r Hypsipetes mcclellandii
 Black bulbul R Hypsipetes leucocephalus
 Nicobar bulbul V r Hypsipetes nicobariensis
 Family: Hypocoliidae
 Grey hypocolius W Hypocolius ampelinus
 Family: Cisticolidae
 Zitting cisticola R Cisticola juncidis
 Bright-headed cisticola r Cisticola exilis
 Streaked scrub warbler r Scotocerca inquieta
 Rufous-vented prinia N r Prinia burnesii
 Striated prinia R Prinia criniger
 Hill prinia r Prinia atrogularis
 Grey-crowned prinia V r Prinia cinereocapilla
 Rufous-fronted prinia R Prinia buchanani
 Rufescent prinia r Prinia rufescens
 Grey-breasted prinia R Prinia hodgsonii
 Graceful prinia R Prinia gracilis
 Jungle prinia R Prinia sylvatica
 Yellow-bellied prinia R Prinia flaviventris
 Ashy prinia R Prinia socialis
 Plain prinia R Prinia inornata
 Family: Zosteropidae
 Sri Lanka white-eye R Zosterops ceylonensis
 Oriental white-eye R Zosterops palpebrosus

South Asia